Gideon Chirchir (born 24 February 1966) is a Kenya former steeplechase athlete.

Chirchir was a 3000 metres steeplechase silver medalist at both the 1994 Commonwealth Games and 1995 All-Africa Games. At the 1995 IAAF World Cross Country Championships in Durham, Chirchir was a member of the Kenyan team which claimed a gold medal in the senior men's race. He is now an athletics coach.

References

External links
Gideon Chirchir at World Athletics

1966 births
Living people
Kenyan male steeplechase runners
Athletes (track and field) at the 1994 Commonwealth Games
Medallists at the 1994 Commonwealth Games
Commonwealth Games silver medallists for Kenya
Commonwealth Games medallists in athletics
Athletes (track and field) at the 1995 All-Africa Games
African Games medalists in athletics (track and field)
African Games silver medalists for Kenya